English electronic music duo Basement Jaxx have released six studio albums, two compilation albums, 17 extended plays, thirty-four singles, one soundtrack album, and a number of other appearances.

Albums

Studio albums

Live albums

Soundtrack albums

Compilation albums

Video albums

Extended plays

Singles

Production and remix credits

Music videos

References

External links 

 
 
 

Discographies of British artists
Electronic music group discographies
House music discographies